Salmabad (also Romanized as Salmābād; also known as Salīmābād and Salm Abad Mo’men Abad) is a village in Momenabad Rural District, in the Central District of Sarbisheh County, South Khorasan Province, Iran. At the 2006 census, its population was 516, in 148 families.

References 

Populated places in Sarbisheh County